Tigridia , is a genus of bulbous or cormous flowering plants belonging to the family Iridaceae. With common names including peacock flowers, tiger-flowers or shell flowers, they have large showy flowers; and one species, Tigridia pavonia, is often cultivated for this. The approximately 35 species in this family grow in the Americas, from Mexico to Chile. The tigridia flower is short lived, each often blooming for only one day, but often several flowers will bloom from the same stalk. Usually they are dormant during the winter dry-season. The roots are edible and were eaten by the Aztecs of Mexico who called it cacomitl, and its flower ocēlōxōchitl "jaguar flower". The genus name Tigridia means "tiger-like", and alludes to the coloration and spotting of the flowers of the type species Tigridia pavonia.

Species

 Tigridia albicans Ravenna - Tacna Province in Peru
 Tigridia alpestris Molseed - Mexico 
 Tigridia amatlanensis Aarón Rodr. & García-Mend - Oaxaca
 Tigridia augusta Drapiez - central + southern Mexico
 Tigridia bicolor Molseed - Oaxaca
 Tigridia catarinensis Cruden - San Luis Potosí
 Tigridia chiapensis Molseed ex Cruden - Chiapas
 Tigridia chrysantha Cruden & S.J.Walker ex McVaugh - Jalisco
 Tigridia convoluta (Ravenna) Goldblatt - Oaxaca
 Tigridia conzattii (R.C.Foster) Goldblatt - Oaxaca
 Tigridia dugesii S.Watson - Jalisco
 Tigridia durangense Molseed ex Cruden - Durango
 Tigridia ehrenbergii (Schltdl.) Molseed - Mexico
 Tigridia estelae López-Ferr. & Espejo - Durango
 Tigridia flammea (Lindl.) Ravenna - Michoacán
 Tigridia galanthoides Molseed - southern Mexico
 Tigridia gracielae Aarón Rodr. & Ortiz-Cat. - México State
 Tigridia hallbergii Molseed - central + southern Mexico, Guatemala
 Tigridia hintonii Molseed - Guerrero
 Tigridia huajuapanensis Molseed ex Cruden - Oaxaca
 Tigridia huyanae (J.F.Macbr.) Ravenna - Lima Province in Peru
 Tigridia illecebrosa Cruden - central + southern Mexico
 Tigridia immaculata (Herb.) Ravenna - Oaxaca, Chiapas, Guatemala
 Tigridia inusitata  (Cruden) Ravenna - Guerrero
 Tigridia mariaetrinitatis Espejo & López-Ferr. - Oaxaca
 Tigridia martinezii Calderón - Hidalgo
 Tigridia matudae Molseed - México State
 Tigridia meleagris (Lindl.) G.Nicholson - central + southern Mexico, Guatemala
 Tigridia mexicana Molseed - central + southern Mexico
 Tigridia minuta Ravenna - Apurímac + Ayacucho Provinces in Peru
 Tigridia molseediana Ravenna - Oaxaca, Guatemala
 Tigridia mortonii Molseed - México State
 Tigridia multiflora  (Baker) Ravenna - central + southern Mexico
 Tigridia oaxacana (Molseed) Goldblatt - Oaxaca
 Tigridia orthantha (Lem.) Ravenna  - Oaxaca, Chiapas, Guatemala
 Tigridia pavonia (L.f.) Redouté - widespread across much of Mexico, Guatemala, El Salvador, Honduras; naturalized in Peru, Ecuador, Madeira
 Tigridia pearcei (Baker) Ravenna - Huánuco region in Peru
 Tigridia philippiana I.M.Johnst. - Tarapacá + Antofagasta Provinces in Chile
 Tigridia potosina López-Ferr. & Espejo - San Luis Potosí
 Tigridia pugana Aarón Rodr. & Ortiz-Cat. - Jalisco
 Tigridia pulchella B.L.Rob. - Jalisco, Michoacán
 Tigridia purpusii Molseed - Puebla
 Tigridia purruchucana (Herb.) Ravenna - Lima Province in Peru
 Tigridia raimondii Ravenna - Arequipa Province in Peru
 Tigridia rzedowskiana Aarón Rodr. & Ortiz-Cat. - Querétaro
 Tigridia seleriana  (Loes.) Ravenna - Oaxaca, Chiapas, Guatemala
 Tigridia suarezii Aarón Rodr. & Ortiz-Cat. - Jalisco
 Tigridia tepoxtlana Ravenna - Morelos
 Tigridia vanhouttei(Baker) Espejo & López-Ferr - central + northeastern Mexico
 Tigridia venusta Cruden - Michoacán
 Tigridia violacea Schiede ex Schltdl. - central + southern Mexico

References

Iridaceae
Iridaceae genera